Hydrolea (false fiddleleaf) is the only genus of the family Hydroleaceae of the order Solanales.

Synonyms
 H. capsularis synonym for Hydrolea spinosa L. 
 H. glabra synonym for Hydrolea spinosa L. 
 H. prostrata synonym for Hydrolea zeylanica (L.) Vahl

Species
Species

H. brevistyla
H. corymbosa
H. elatior 
H. floribunda
H. macrosepala
H. ovata
H. palustris
H. quadrivalvis
H. spinosa
H. uniflora
H. zeylanica

References

External links
 The Plant List

Solanales genera
Flora of North America
Solanales